The Indonesian Navy (TNI-AL) is the naval branch of the Indonesian National Armed Forces. It was founded on 10 September 1945 and has a role to patrol Indonesia's lengthy coastline, to enforce and patrol the territorial waters and Exclusive Economic Zone (EEZ) of Indonesia, to protect Indonesia's maritime strategic interests, to protect the islands surrounding Indonesia, and to defend against seaborne threats.

The Navy is headed by the Chief of Staff of the Navy ( – KSAL or KASAL). The Navy also heads the Marine Corps.

Mission
According to Article 9 of Law No.34/2004 on the National Armed Forces, the Navy has the following tasks:
 perform military duties in national defence;
 enforce the law and secure the order in the sea area of national jurisdiction in accordance with national laws and ratified international laws;
 perform diplomatic duties in support of foreign policy set by the government;
 engage other duties relevant for the maintenance and development of naval power;
 support civilian empowerment in sea defence areas.

History

Creation and actions during the revolution
The official Indonesian Navy's history began on 10 September 1945, at the outset of the Indonesian National Revolution. The administration of the early Indonesian government established the People's Marine Security Agency on 22 August 1945, the predecessor to the modern Indonesian Navy. BKR Laut with only wooden ships, a few landing craft and weapons left by Japan,  was initially composed of Indonesian sailors who had served in the ranks of the Royal Netherlands Navy during the Dutch colonial period, and who had fought the Japanese during the years of military occupation, plus active militias who served with the Japanese and ex-Indonesian officers and ratings of the Imperial Japanese Navy. The formation of the Indonesian military organisation known as the People's Security Army on 5 October 1945, at the height of the National Revolution, helped spur the further existence of the TKR Naval Branch – the Peoples' Security Navy, which later became the Republic of Indonesia Navy.

As the revolution grew and the Navy began its work, naval bases were established throughout the archipelago. Former ships of the Imperial Japanese Navy handed down to the new republic were acquired. Simple strength did not discourage the Navy to deploy Sea Traffic Operations in order to spread the news of the proclamation and helping to form and train Republican military forces and militias nationwide. Besides, they also attempted to breach the Dutch naval blockade in order to obtain aid from abroad.

The newly formed navy confronted the more superior Royal Netherlands Navy in Bali, Sibolga and Cirebon. Cross-sea operations are also able to prepare the armed forces in South Kalimantan, Bali and Sulawesi. Limitations in strength and ability to lead the Navy had to divert the struggle in the countryside, after most boats were sunk and nearly all bases battered by the Dutch and Allied military forces. But the determination to participate again in the sea never subsided. In the hard times during the National Revolution the Navy succeeded in forming the Fleet Forces (CA), Marine Corps, and educational institutions in various places. The formation of these elements mark the presence of aspects for the formation of a modern national navy.

After the revolution

The end of the War of Independence marked the development of the Navy as a modern naval power. In accordance to the results of the Round Table Conference, in 1949, the Navy received a variety of war equipment such as warships and its supporting facilities such as naval bases. This step in the consolidation of the body along with the Navy, revamping the organization and recruitment of personnel through educational institutions before manning naval equipment. During 1949–1959, the Indonesian Navy managed to enhance its strength and improve its capabilities. In the field of organization the navy reorganized its Fleet Forces, the Marine Corps – then  (KKO-AL – Naval Commando Corps Command), naval aviation and a number of regions as territorial defense command aspects of the sea. Navy combat equipment grew, both from the Dutch and from other various countries.

With the increased strength and the capability, the Navy began refining the strategy, tactics, and techniques of marine operations, which are directly applied in a variety of military operations in order to deal with separatist movements that have sprung up in the year from 1950 to 1959. In operations against PRRI in Sumatra, Permesta , Darul Islam in West Java, and RMS in the Moluccas, the Navy gained lessons in applying the concept of marine operations, amphibious operations, and joint operations with other forces.

At the height of the Cold War

The Navy experienced a significant progress until 1965 which was motivated by the politics of confrontation in order to seize West Irian, which Indonesia claimed as part of its territory, a claim refuted by the Dutch government. As part of the increasing military ties between Indonesia and the Warsaw Pact, various naval combat equipments from Eastern European countries strengthened the Navy and become the dominant force at the time. With such power in the era of the 1960s the Navy was called the largest Navy in Southeast Asia and one of the strongest within the Asia-Pacific, outranking those of its neighbors in armament and prestige.

By January 1962 the Indonesian Navy started preparing a couple of naval operations for the liberation of West Irian known as Operation Trikora, which began on 15 December the year before as part of the military component of that operation under the Mandala Command for the Liberation of West Irian . Beginning 1 January, fast-ship torpedo vessels of the Navy were forward deployed to deal with destroyers, frigates and aircraft of the Royal Netherlands Navy. On January 15, 1962 Commodore Yos Sudarso along with RI Matjan Tutul sank in the sea battle in the Arafura Sea. This battle is known as the Vlakke Hoek incident. By mid-year the Navy was preparing to organize its role in the planned Operation Jayawijaya which would have been the largest amphibious operation in the history of Indonesian military operations if commenced. The naval component was made up of 100 warships and 16,000 sailors and Marines. The deployment of forces preparatory to the planned landings in West Papua forced the Dutch to return to negotiations and reached an agreement to hand over West Irian to Indonesia.

After seizing West Irian, Sukarno by 1963 moved his sights on Malaysia. Indonesia political confrontation against Neocolonialism and Imperialism (Nekolim) continued in Operation Dwikora to oppose the formation of Malaysia. Although elements of the National Armed Forces were prepared for operational deployments to the new state,  the operations were limited to the infiltration operation along the Borneo frontier. Soldiers from the marine corps were involved in the operations which targeted both the Malaysian states of Sabah and Sarawak. The Marine Corps, though, would figure in the 1964 MacDonald House bombing in Singapore.

1965 onwards

Operation Dwikora was discontinued in 1965 along with a succession of governments in Indonesia after an abortive coup d'état took place in Jakarta, which were organized by the self-proclaimed organization of Indonesian National Armed Forces members who, in the early hours of 1 October 1965, assassinated six Indonesian Army generals and killed 3 more. Since 1966, the Navy experienced a new chapter in its history as the military integration efforts. With the integration of the armed forces organizationally and operationally been able to keep up on the implementation of tasks in the field of defense and security so doctrinally, the direction of development of the power and capabilities of each branch to be concentrated. The operations were prominent during the period of the 1970s was Operation Seroja in the framework of the integration of East Timor to Indonesia. The Navy played an active role in the operation of landings, a joint ground operation, and transporting troops by sea. 

Starting the 1980s the Navy began to modernize combat equipment. Ships made in Eastern Europe that has been the core strength of the Navy in the era of the 1960s and 1970s were not suited to meet the growing and changing needs for the navy and its branches (saving for its submarines and several corvettes and frigates, the submarines were retired in 1990). The worsening relations between Indonesia and the Soviet Union after the government of President Sukarno resulted a cessation of military cooperation between the two countries and the Warsaw Pact. Therefore, the Navy switched once more to using Western technology to modernize the power and ability to buy warships, logistics vessels and other major combat equipment from various countries. In 1993 the Navy also received 39 ships from the former  (East German Navy), including 16 s, 14 Frosch-class landing ship tanks (LSTs), and 9 Kondor II-class minessweepers. Aside from these the Navy reorganized its forces. In 1984, as part of an-Armed Forces wide unit reorganization, the former Naval Regions, which in turn governed Naval Bases and Naval Districts and subordinate Naval Stations and Naval Air Stations, were turned into Main Naval Bases of the Navy Fleet Commands, divided from the formerly unified National Fleet Command on the basis of the Western and Eastern Squadrons of the Fleet. The National Fleet Command by the late 1960s was briefly split into two operational fleets - the Ocean Fleet Force (for defense operations abroad) and the Archipelago Fleet (for local defense operations within Indonesia), until these were fused into a unified command in 1970.

At the same time the Navy began to develop a non-combat military operations in the form of humanitarian service program  in various remote areas in Indonesia that can only be reached by sea. The core of the operating activities are health services, construction and rehabilitation of public facilities and various counseling in health, law, and civil defense. This event is held regularly every year until now. A number of countries also participated in these activities, among others, Singapore, Australia and the United States. The navy also seeks promoting the development of the maritime sector, especially those related to aspects of defense and security at sea, activities that had been present since independence before the formation of the Ministry of Maritime Affairs and Fisheries. The actual activities undertaken today by the Navy are establishing marine development assessment bodies together with the government and private sectors in some areas, coastal village pilot programs are summarized in Coastal Rural Development (Bindesir), and the National Potential Development Program for Maritime Defense (Binpotnaskuatmar). In order to encourage the spirit of the seafaring nation, the Navy held an international scale maritime event  1995. The navy was responsible for the programs for National Maritime Year 1996 and the Bunaken Declaration of 1998, which is a manifestation of marine development in Indonesia.

Expansion in the 21st century 

During the presidencies of Susilo Bambang Yudhoyono and Joko Widodo, the Navy has begun a program of expansion of its combat commands and has begun a program of national warship construction in naval arsenals, while acquiring nationally produced transport aircraft for the needs of the Navy.

Organization 
According to Presidential Regulation No. 66/2019 on the Organization of the Indonesian National Armed Forces, the organizational structure of the navy comprises the following components:

Leadership Elements 
 Chief of Staff of the Navy, position held by a four-star Admiral or Marine General; and
 Deputy Chief of Staff of the Navy, position held by a three-star Vice Admiral or Marine Lieutenant General.

Leadership support elements 
The following positions of the leadership supports are equivalent to a Navy Staff organization.
 Inspectorate General of the Navy, position held by two-star Rear Admiral;
 Advisor to the Navy Chief of Staff, position held by two-star Rear Admiral or one-star First Admiral;
 Naval Planning and Budgeting Staff;
 Naval Intelligence Staff;
 Naval Operation Staff;
 Naval Personnel Staff;
 Naval Logistics Staff;
 Naval Maritime Potential Staff; and
 Naval Communication and Electronics Staff.

Central Executive Agencies 
The following agencies are central executive agencies, directly subordinated under the Navy Headquarters.

Academies and Schools
 Naval Academy
 Naval Command and Staff College
 Naval Technological College
Centers
 Naval Aviation Center;
 Naval Military Police Center; and
 Naval Frogman Forces Command.
Services
 Naval Security and Cipher Service;
 Naval Public Relations Service;
 Naval Communications and Electronic Systems Service;
 Naval Justice Service;
 Naval Operations and Training Service;
 Naval Maritime Potential Service;
 Naval Personnel Administration Service;
 Naval Education and Training Service;
 Naval Personnel Maintenance Service;
 Naval Medical Department;
 Naval Materiel Service;
 Naval Weapons and Electronics Materiel Service;
 Naval Seaworthiness Service;
 Naval Base Facilities Service;
 Naval Procurement Service;
 Naval Logistics Service;
 Naval Finance Service;
 Naval Research and Development Service;
 Naval Information and Data Processing Service;
 Naval Psychology Service;
 Naval Historical Heritage Service; and
 Naval Mental Guidance and Chaplaincy Service.

Naval Aviation 
The Indonesian Naval Aviation Center is a part of the Navy's Central Executive Agencies led by a Rear Admiral. Puspenerbal serves as the center of guidance to the Navy's aviation units in the field of personnel as well as the readiness of air elements in support of the main missions of the Navy. Indonesian Naval Aviation is not just a combat unit, but also participates in various Marine Corps operational duties as well as providing logistics and personnel tactical transport facilities for marine and airbase systems. In carrying out these tasks, Puspenerbal carries out flight functions which include: Air surveillance, anti-submarine, fast logistics support, maritime patrol, marine combat operations, and the provision of material coaching functions. This unit is in charge of supporting naval operations, both for combat operations, SAR operations and humanitarian relief operations during times of calamities. Marine security to monitor the movement of foreign ships, especially in the archipelagic sea lanes of Indonesia, environmental protection from the pollution of dangerous materials, the prevention of smuggling and theft of marine wealth is also an important mission carried by Puspenerbal, in cooperation with other air force elements such as TNI-AU and Police. One of the most famous acts of Navy aircraft in the 21st century was when they were involved in evacuating victims of the 2006 Yogyakarta earthquake.

Principal Commands under the Navy Chief of Staff 

  Indonesian Fleet Command. The Navy's military strength are spread across several Main Naval Bases and Naval Bases throughout Indonesia, these bases and the regional base commands fall under the direct supervision of the fleet commanders' office. Navy Headquarters assigned the numbering of Main Naval Base I to XI according to its respective geographical location from west to east on 1 August 2006 in line with the inauguration of the Teluk Bayur Naval Base in Padang, West Sumatra into Main Naval Base II. In 2015, three Naval Base were upgraded to Main Naval Base with the numbering of XII, XIII and XIV. Each Main Naval Base is organized into a number of naval bases and naval stations plus a number of Naval Air Stations. The Fleet Command is led by a three-star Vice Admiral and responsible for all the three fleet commands.
  1st Fleet Command based in Tanjung Uban in Riau Islands, coterminous with Army's KODAM Jayakarta, KODAM Iskandar Muda, KODAM I/Bukit Barisan, KODAM II/Sriwijaya, KODAM III/Siliwangi, and KODAM XII/Tanjungpura, as well as Air Force's 1st Operational Command West.
 Main Naval Base I based in Belawan, oversees naval bases covering Sabang, Dumai, Lhokseumawe, Tanjung Balai and Simeulue. The main naval base also oversee one Naval Air Station in Sabang and two facilities maintenance and repair in Sabang and Belawan. The main naval base is scheduled to be moved to Lhokseumawe in Aceh.
Main Naval Base II based in Padang, oversees naval bases covering Sibolga, Nias, Mentawai (planned), and Bengkulu.
 Main Naval Base III based in Jakarta, oversees six naval bases covering Palembang, Cirebon, Lampung, Banten, Bandung, and Bangka-Belitung. Moreover, it has a maintenance and repair facility in Pondok Dayung. These maintenance and repair facility now has the ability to manufacture small patrol boat with a size of 28–35 meters. Furthermore, the main naval base also oversees Naval Air Station in Pondok Cabe.
 Main Naval Base IV based in Tanjung Pinang, oversees naval bases covering Batam, Tarempa, Ranai, Tanjung Balai Karimun, and Dabo Singkep. The Main Naval Base also possesses a maintenance and repair facility in Mentigi capable of manufacturing patrol boats with a length of 12, 28, and 35 meters. In addition, it has two Naval Air Stations in Matak, Natuna Islands, and in Tanjung Pinang.
Main Naval Base XII based in Pontianak, oversees naval bases covering Pangkalan Bun, Ketapang and Sambas.
  2nd Fleet Command ( based in Surabaya, coterminous with Army's KODAM IV/Diponegoro, KODAM V/Brawijaya, KODAM VI/Mulawarman, KODAM IX/Udayana, KODAM XIII/Merdeka, and KODAM XIV/Hasanuddin, as well as Air Force's 2nd Operation Command Central.
 Main Naval Base V based in Surabaya, oversees seven naval bases and one Naval Air Station, including Tegal, Cilacap, Semarang, Yogyakarta, Malang, Banyuwangi, Denpasar, and Batuporon.
 Main Naval Base VI based in Makassar, in charge of naval bases in Palu, Mamuju, and Kendari.
 Main Naval Base VII based in Kupang, East Nusa Tenggara, in charge of naval bases in Mataram, Maumere, and Kupang. In addition, it has one Naval Air Station in Kupang.
 Main Naval Base VIII based in Manado, North Sulawesi, in charge of naval bases Tahuna, Gorontalo, and Toli-Toli. In addition, it has one Naval Air Station in Manado.
 Main Naval Base XIII based in Tarakan, North Kalimantan, oversees naval bases in Sangatta, Balikpapan, Kotabaru, Banjarmasin, and Nunukan
  3rd Fleet Command based in Sorong, coterminous with Air Force's 3rd Operational Command East and Army's KODAM XVI/Pattimura, KODAM XVII/Cenderawasih, and KODAM XVIII/Kasuari.
 Main Naval Base IX based in Ambon, oversees naval bases in Ternate, Saumlaki, Morotai Island, Tual and Ambon.
 Main Naval Base X based in Jayapura, oversees Biak Naval Base and Biak Naval Air Station.
 Main Naval Base XI based in Merauke, oversees naval bases in Timika and Aru Islands. In addition, it has one Naval Air Station  in Aru Islands.
 Main Naval Base XIV based in Sorong, in charge of the maintenance and repair facility in Manokwari which is capable of producing small patrol boats of length of 12 and 28 meters.
  Naval Hydro-Oceanographic Center;
  Indonesian Marine Corps, with three Marine Forces and an independent Marine Brigade plus support units;
  Naval Doctrine, Education, and Training Development Command:
 Naval Operation Education Command;
 Marine Corps Education Command;
 Naval Support Training Command;
 Basic Military Training and Education Centre;
 Electronics and Naval Weapon Guidance System Training Centre;
 Naval Operation Training Centre; and
 Marine Corps Training Centre.
  Military Sealift Command coordinates the navy's logistical assets in support of its personnel.
 Military Sealift Force Jakarta
 Military Sealift Force Surabaya
 Military Sealift Force Makassar

Naval territorial organization leadership 
Each of the 3 Fleet Commands are led by Rear Admirals as commanding officers with Commodores as chiefs of staff and executive officers, and are organized into:

 Main Naval Bases, commanded by a Commodore or Brigadier General (Marine Corps)
 Naval Bases (Type B), commanded by a Colonel (Navy / Marine Corps)
 Naval Bases (Type C), commanded by a Lieutenant Colonel (Navy / Marine Corps)
 Naval Bases (Type D), commanded by a Major (Navy / Marine Corps)
 Naval Stations
 Naval Stations Type A, commanded by a Captain (Navy / Marine Corps)
 Naval Stations Type B, commanded by a First Lieutenant (Navy / Marine Corps)
 Naval Stations Type C, commanded by a Second Lieutenant (Navy / Marine Corps)
 Naval Maintenance and Repair Facilities, with similar organization as in regular naval bases
 Naval Air Stations, with similar organization as in regular naval bases, but report to the Naval Aviation Center

The Main Naval Base organization additionally contains a naval security unit and an administrative regiment of one naval police battalion and one Marine Corps base defense battalion.

Specialty Corps
In general, specialty corps in the navy can be divided into 3 levels according to detail of specialization and rank, which are officer's corps (usually has special title of "Laut" or "Marinir" after their rank), NCOs corps (specialized corps, including warrant officers) and enlisted corps (most specialized corps).

All officers regardless of specialty corps wear either peaked caps or specialty coloured berets with their uniforms. Women officers wear crusher caps regardless of their specialty.

Fleet Forces or Seamanship corps (Korps Pelaut) [abbrv: (P)] – Most wear navy blue berets excepting those of the Submarine Flottillas that wear black berets, enlisted wear  sailor caps with their dress uniforms, senior ranked NCOs wear  peaked caps.
NCOs' Corps
Nautical Corps (Bahari), [abbrv: BAH]
Navigation Corps (Navigasi), [abbrv: NAV]
Communication Corps (Komunikasi), [abbrv: KOM]
Surface Weapon Systems (Senjata Atas Air), [abbrv: SAA]
Underwater Weapon Systems (Senjata Bawah Air), [abbrv: SBA]
Enlisted's Corps
Telegraphic Corps (Telegrafis), [abbrv: TLG]
Signal Corps (Isyarat), [abbrv: ISY]
Naval Ammunition Corps (Amunisi), [abbrv: AMO]
Naval Artillery (Meriam), [abbrv: MER]
Naval Missile Artillery (Rudal), [abbrv: RJD]
Naval Mines and Demolition (Ranjau Laut dan Demolisi), [abbrv: RJD]
Torpedo and Depth Charges (Torpedo dan Bom Laut), [abbrv: TRB]
Naval Engineering Corps (Korps Teknik), [abbrv: T] - Enlisted ratings and senior NCOs wear construction helmets when performing engineering or transport work, the same case with officers.
NCOs' Corps
Mechanical Engineers (Teknik Mesin), [abbrv: MES]
Civil Engineering (Teknik Bangunan) [abbrv: THB]
Motorized Transportation (Angkutan Bermotor), [abbrv: ANG]
Enlisted's Corps
Diesel Mechanical Engineers (Teknik Mesin Diesel), [abbrv: MDL]
General Construction Engineering (Teknik Konstruksi Umum), [abbrv: TKU]
Electronic Corps (Korps Elektronika), [abbrv: E]
NCOs' Corps
Electronic Detection, (Elektronika Deteksi), [abbrv: EDE]
Electronic Communication, (Elektronika Komunikasi), [abbrv: EKO]
Electronic Control, (Elektronika Kendali), [abbrv: EKL]
Armaments and Munitions Electronics, (Elektronika Senjata dan Amunisi), [abbrv: ESA]
Computer Electronics, (Elektronika Teknik Komputer), [abbrv: ETK]
Electronics and Electricity Corps (Korps Elektronika Kelistrikan), [abbrv: LIS]
Enlisted's Corps
Armaments Electronics, (Elektronika Teknik Senjata), [abbrv: ETA]
Supply and Administration Corps (Korps Suplai atau Administrasi), [abbrv: S]
NCOs' Corps
Finance (Keuangan), [abbrv: KEU]
Administration (Tata Usaha), [abbrv: TTU]
Housekeeping (Tata Graha), [abbrv: TTG]
Supply (Perbekalan), [abbrv: BEK]
Marine Corps (Korps Marinir), [abbrv: Mar] – Personnel wear magenta berets 
NCO and Enlisted's Corps
Infantry (Infanteri), [abbrv: INF]
Amphibious Reconnaissance (Intai Amfibi), [abbrv: IAM]
Artillery (Artileri), [abbrv: ART]
Cavalry (Kavaleri), [abbrv: KAV]
Communications (Komunikasi), [abbrv: KOM]
Combat Engineers (Zeni), [abbrv: ZNI]
Transport, Logistics and Ordnance (Angkutan dan Peralatan), [abbrv: ABP]
Medical Service Corps (Korps Kesehatan), [abbrv: K]
NCOs' Corps
General Nurse (Rawat Umum), [abbrv: RUM]
Dental Nurse (Rawat Gigi), [abbrv: RKG]
Pharmacy Corps (Farmasi), [abbrv: FAR]
Hospital Corpsman (Asisten Paramedik), [abbrv: APM]
Enlisted's Corps
Hospital Corpsman (Asisten Paramedik), [abbrv: APM]
Special Corps (Korps Khusus), [abbrv: KH]
NCOs' Corps
Physical Fitness and Sports (Jasmani), [abbrv: JAS]
Band Service (Musik), [abbrv: MUS]
Computer Data Processor (Pengelola Data Komputer), [abbrv: PDK]
Naval Military Police Corps (Korps Polisi Militer), [abbrv: PM] – Personnel wear light blue berets biased to the left or blue MP helmets
NCO and Enlisted's Corps
Military Police (Polisi Militer), [abbrv: PM]
Women's Naval Service Corps  (Korps Wanita Angkatan Laut (KOWAL)), [abbrv: (.../W], whereas "..." refers to other specialty corps from above. - Personnel wear variant crusher caps with their uniforms or a naval Tricorne for Senior NCOs, naval policewomen wear the light blue beret.

Equipment

Ground forces

Marine Corps

The Indonesian Marine Corps officially known as KORMAR RI, "Marinir" or "Korps Marinir" is an integral part of the TNI-AL. It is sized at the military corps level serving as the Naval Infantry and main amphibious warfare force of the  TNI. Distinguished from other TNI-AL members by their unique  qualification badges and insignia and unique magenta berets. It is commanded by a two star ranked officer. It has three divisions, which are:
 Pasukan Marinir I (PASMAR I) (Marine Force I) based in Jakarta.
 Pasukan Marinir II (PASMAR II) (Marine Force II) based in Surabaya.
 Pasukan Marinir III (PASMAR III) (Marine Force III) based in Sorong.
The three marine divisions are each led by a one star ranked officer.

Special Forces

Kopaska
 

Formed on 31 March 1962, the Indonesian Navy Frogman Forces Command (Komando Pasukan Katak) or Kopaska is a Frogman unit of the TNI-AL. There are three fleet frogmnan units with detachments specializing in sabotage / anti-sabotage (terror), special operations, combat SAR, EOD and naval minesweeping, underwater demolition and special boat units. KOPASKA's main duties are underwater demolition (raiding enemy ships and bases), destroying main underwater installations, reconnaissance, prisoner snatches, preparing beaches for larger naval amphibious operations, and counter-terrorism. In peacetime the unit deploys a seven-person team to serve as security personnel for VIPs. They wear the maroon beret.

Yontaifib

The Marine amphibious reconnaissance battalion (Batalyon Intai Amfibi) or Yontaifib is an elite recon unit within the Indonesian Marine Corps which is tasked for conducting Amphibious reconnaissance and Special reconnaissance. Taifib was previously known as "Kipam" (abbreviation from: "Komando Intai Para Amfibi") which literally means in English: the Para-Amphibious reconnaissance Commandos.

They were officially formed on 13 March 1961 as marine commandos in response to Operation Trikora. Set at a regimental strength of three battalions, "Taifib" was formed as the elite amphibious reconnaissance unit of the Marine Corps, and as a unit of that formation wears purple berets.

Denjaka

Jala Mangkara Detachment (Detasemen Jala Mangkara) or Denjaka is the special operations and counter-terrorism forces of the Indonesian Navy. This is a combined detachment formed from selected personnel of the Navy's Underwater Special Unit (Kopaska) and the Marine Corps' Amphibious Reconnaissance Battalion (Taifib). The unit was formed in 1984 by the Commander of the Indonesian National Armed Forces to counter maritime strategic threats including terrorism and sabotage. Despite the specific reason for its formation, as in the case of any other special operations forces around the world, the detachment is also fully trained in conducting reconnaissance, unconventional warfare, and clandestine behind-enemy-lines operations. Denjaka's primary task is to develop anti-terrorism, anti-sabotage and other clandestine operations capabilities in support of maritime counter-terrorism, counter-sabotage and other special operations as directed by the commander of the armed forces. Denjaka personnel wear the purple beret.

Ongoing projects
The Indonesian Navy is progressing the Minimum Essential Force plan to replenish and modernise the fleet, this includes achieving 151 vessels (minimum), 220 vessels (standard), or 274 vessels (ideal), for which it has a blueprint out to 2024. Some of those platforms yet to be delivered include:

 Martadinata-class frigate As of January 2018, the first two of four s were commissioned into service.

Nagapasa-class submarines As of April 2019, two South Korean Daewoo Shipbuilding & Marine Engineering (DSME)-built s were commissioned into service and a third Indonesian state-owned shipbuilder PT PAL Indonesia-built submarine was undergoing sea trials. A contract for three more Nagapasa-class submarines was signed with DSME in April 2019 with completion of the final boat anticipated in 2026.Teluk Bintuni''-class tank landing ship As of March 2022, eight of the planned twelve s were commissioned into service.

In January 2020 the Indonesian Minister of Defence Prabowo Subianto during a bilateral meeting in France and met with his French counterpart Florence Parly it was reported that the Ministry is interested on French military equipment including 48 Dassault Rafale, four  submarines, and two  corvettes/frigates.

In February 2020, a defense delegation from Indonesia visited Denmark, and toured  . According to Indonesian media, the deputy of the Indonesian Ministry of Defense Sakti Wahyu Trenggono said in March that Indonesia's PT PAL was tasked to develop a design for two ships over five years, for Rp1.1 trillion (or USD720 million) in collaboration with Denmark, for the Indonesian Navy. On 30 April, representatives from the Indonesian ministry of defense, PT PAL, and PT Sinar Kokoh Persada, an Indonesian agent for the Danish Odense Maritime Technology company, had agreed to an opening contract for the procurement of the Danish frigate. Points in the contract include workshare arrangements that will be made after the effective (actual) contract can be realized. On September 16, 2021, Indonesia signed a contract with Babcock for the purchase of the Type 31 frigate design license, which based on the Iver Huitfeldt design, in order to construct 2 frigates locally in Indonesia.

On 10 June 2021, Indonesian ministry of defense and Fincantieri had signed contract deals for six FREMM frigates and two s.

On 10 February 2022, Naval Grup and PT PAL had signed MoU for 2 Scorpene submarines equipped with AIP.

Integrated Maritime Surveillance Systems
With various coastal radars, Indonesia has one of the world's longest Integrated Maritime Surveillance Systems (IMSS).

The IMSS is a tightly integrated network of ship and shore based sensors, communications devices, and computing resources that collect, transmit, analyze and display a broad array of maritime data including Automatic Identification System (AIS), surface radar, surveillance cameras, Global Positioning System (GPS), equipment health monitors and radio transmissions of maritime traffic in wide operating areas.  Redundant sensors and multiple communication paths make the IMSS a robust and capable system. The IMSS enhances Indonesia's ability to detect, track, and monitor vessels passing through territorial and international waters. This capability is crucial to combating piracy, illegal fishing, smuggling, and terrorism within and around Indonesia's maritime borders. The IMSS is manned and operated by the Indonesian Navy, and consists of 18 Coastal Surveillance Stations (CSS), 11 Ship-based Radars, two Regional Command Centers, and two Fleet Command Centers (Jakarta and Surabaya).

Chief of Staff of the Navy

Rank structure

In the navy, as well as in other armed forces branches in Indonesia, the rank consists of officer in Indonesian known as "Perwira", NCO "Bintara" and enlisted "Tamtama".

The Indonesian Navy is one of few navies in the world which use rank titles similar to its Army, except for flag officers and lower-ranking enlisted sailors. However the Indonesian Marine Corps, which is a branch of the Navy, uses exactly the same rank titles as those of the Army, but still uses Navy-style insignia (for lower-ranking enlisted marines, blue replaces the red colour). Starting 2006, navy personnel assigned abroad are authorized to use foreign service uniform, officially named "Black Navy" (similar to service dress blues in United States Navy) during their service overseas (e.g. during training exercises), which includes sleeve and cuff insignia.

The proper title to address rank are as follows, all high-ranking officers (Admiral or Marine General) use their rank followed by "(TNI)", while other officers use their rank followed by respective branch/corps. For example, a Navy captain from fleet forces corps uses the title "Kolonel Laut Pelaut" (written as "Kolonel Laut (P)"), while a Navy Vice Admiral uses the title "Laksamana Madya (TNI)" regardless of their previous branches. Warrant officers, NCOs and enlisted seamen may put their respective branch/corps specialty, for example: "Pembantu Letnan Dua SAA" (warrant officer from surface weaponry corps) and "Kelasi Dua TRB''" (seaman recruit from torpedo corps). All marine corps personnel, general officers inclusive, use their rank followed by "(Mar)".

Note: Indonesia is not a member of NATO, so there is not an official equivalence between the Indonesian military ranks and those defined by NATO. The displayed parallel is approximate and for illustration purposes only.

Note: The red banding on the rank insignia denotes the personnel holding a command position which is agnostic of rank.

Officers

Enlisted ratings

See also

List of former ships of the Indonesian Navy
Indonesian military ranks
Indonesian Army
Indonesian Air Force

References

External links

 Official website
 Indonesian Navy ships and equipment (Navy Recognition)
 ALRI – Navy of the Republic of Indonesia @ Globalsecurity.com

 
Military of Indonesia
Military units and formations established in 1945